The Ukrainian Aviation Group was a Ukrainian informal monopoly alliance of three airlines owned by Privat Group and led by Ihor Kolomoyskyi. The group was founded in 2007 by combining Dniproavia, Aerosvit and Donbassaero; these airlines often provide each other with the opportunity to use each other's aircraft, with flights more than often being operated for Aerosvit (the alliance's largest carrier). When Privat Group acquired Ukraine's largest airline  Ukraine International Airlines in February 2011 Privat Group had a near monopoly on the aviation business in Ukraine.

The three companies of Ukrainian Aviation Group, together with sister Windrose Airlines, were experiencing major debt troubles in late 2012, as Privat Group was shifting its focus on larger and more profitable Ukraine International Airlines. In January 2013 Aerosvit and Donbassaero ceased operations due to being bankrupt; while a much smaller Dniproavia emerged from bankruptcy and continued limited operation until the end of 2017.

References

Privat Group